Marco Zernicke (born December 5, 1969) is a German former footballer.

References

External links
 

1969 births
Living people
German footballers
Association football fullbacks
Hertha BSC II players
Hertha BSC players
SC Fortuna Köln players
Alemannia Aachen players
Bundesliga players
2. Bundesliga players